Funtumia is a genus of flowering plants in the family Apocynaceae first described as a genus in 1900. It is native to Africa.

Species
 Funtumia africana (Benth.) Stapf - widespread from Senegal to Tanzania, south to Zimbabwe
 Funtumia elastica (Preuss) Stapf - widespread from Senegal to Sudan + Tanzania, south to Zaire

References

Apocynaceae genera
Malouetieae
Taxa named by René Louiche Desfontaines